Gorakhpur or Gorfar is a town of Rawalpindi District in the Punjab province of Pakistan on Adiyala road. It is located at 33.4763° N, 73.0331° E with an altitude of 416 metres (1246 ft), and lies south of the district capital, Rawalpindi near Central Jail Rawalpindi, also known as Adiala Jail.

Telecommunication
The PTCL provides the main network of landline telephone. Many ISPs and all major mobile phone, Wireless companies operating in Pakistan provide service in Gorakhpur.

Languages
Punjabi is the main language of Gorakhpur, other languages are Urdu, Pothohari and rarely spoken language Pashto.

References

Villages in Rawalpindi District
Populated places in Rawalpindi Cantonment
Populated places in Punjab, Pakistan